Kot Chibban is a small village in Azad Kashmir, Pakistan located within foothills of Himalayas and in the district and tehsil of Bhimber. it has a population of approximately a thousand people living within 120 houses.

Due to its location on a small hill, the nearest facilities and conveniences can be found in the nearby towns of Dhandar and Kadhala. Kot is located on the site of an old citadel (castle) hence the name Kot. The castle and adjoining town was destroyed in 960 AD by Maharaja of Kashmir due to the local governor ending his allegiance to the Maharaja in Srinagir. Kot and the town (old bhimber) was burned to the ground and the people killed, hence the human skeletons and burned property on the adjoining hill called Pangloor. Kot and Pangloor is a national heritage site with history of at least two thousand years  but is being destroyed by buildings and general destruction.

Geography 
This village consists of three areas: Chupri, Nakka, and Shahnian de taki.

The nearest villages are Kot Jattan, Dhandar Kalan, Dhandar Khord, Khord, Slawan, Kadhala, Kangra, Maglora, Tera, Barsali, Barhing, and nearest in Pakistan Nandwal, Machhora, Singla, Sarsala, Chirawla.

Education 
There are two primary schools, one each for boys and girls. The nearest high schools can be found in Dhandar, with one each again for boys and girls and one college for boys. In addition, other private schools can be found there.

Religion 
Kot Chibban is Muslim village with two mosques.

Public library 
A public library with almost 5000 books is there.

References

Populated places in Bhimber District